Zipfel is a surname. Notable people with the surname include:

Bud Zipfel (born 1938), American baseball player
Patrick Zipfel (born 1967), American basketball coach and college athletics director
Paul Albert Zipfel (1935–2019), American Roman Catholic bishop
Peter Zipfel (born 1956), German skier

See also
7565 Zipfel, astral object